Lutis Abd Al Karim is an Egyptian writer, and a member of the Supreme Council of Culture, the Council of Foreign Affairs, and the Board of Directors of Fine Art Critics.

Early life and education 
Lutis Abd Al Karim was born in Alexandria, and belongs to a family that was interested in and worked in the arts, literature and politics. Her uncle Amin Othman Pasha was Minister of Finance during the royal era, and Anwar Sadat was one of those accused of his assassination and her grandfather the writer Muhammad Bey Othman was one of those who participated in the founding of the National Party with  Leader Mustafa Kamel in 1907 AD.  

She graduated from Alexandria University, Department of Philosophy, and received a Master's degree in Social Sciences from the University of London, and a Doctorate in Philosophy from the Sorbonne University in Paris.

Career
Moving in most of her life outside Egypt, and she lived in the countries of Asia and Europe for long years and her memories in this country were revealed in memorandums published at close intervals. She also wrote a study on the people of Japan and its traditions and taught at the University of Tokyo, she was very accompanied by the world and artists.

Abd Al Karim has devoted symposia in its cultural salon attended by politicians and senior writers, and celebrates in it, as well as in Al-Shamwa magazine, which specializes in the memory of writers and writers, which it chaired, such as Taha Hussein, Tawfiq Al-Hakim, Abdul Wahab, Umm Kulthum, Baligh Hamdi, Nizar Qabbani, Sayed Makkawi, Mustafa Amin, Al-Akkad, Youssef Idris, Mustafa Mahmoud, Youssef Wehbe, Sana Jamil, Muhammad Al-Mouji, Queen Farida, Hussein Bekar, Salah Taher, Sabri Mawd Morsi, Mahmood  and others.

Author
Abd Al Karim issued a book about the musician of generations Mohamed Abdel Wahab in which his talks and salon seminars were recorded, and a second edition was issued by the Egyptian General Book Organization in 2003 AD, and a book about the romantic knight, the writer Youssef El Sebaei 2004 AD, then a book about the life of the writer Ihsan Abdel Quddus and literature, and also a book about the dean of the theater, Youssef Wehbe. As for her book about Queen Farida, which was published in 1993 AD, it was the title of a great and deep friendship that developed between them when the Queen chose her studio and the art hall that she creates in the house of Lotus Abdel Karim. The Candles Hall was the first private art hall in Egypt, and it continued to present the works of senior artists after the Queen’s departure.

In February 2008, she issued another book about Queen Farida entitled "Queen Farida and I - a biography that the Queen of Egypt did not write" from the "Kitab Al-Youm" series, which is issued monthly by Akhbar Al-Youm Foundation. She also issued a book on the same series in December 2008 entitled "Mustafa Mahmoud.. The Question of Existence between Religion, Science and Philosophy", and headed the editorship of "The Book of Candles", which was published by Al-Shamou magazine, and in it the book Tawfiq Al-Hakim. One Hundred Years was published with submission and supervision. Lutis Abd Al Karim.

References 

Living people
Alexandria University alumni
Alumni of the University of London
Writers from Alexandria
Egyptian biographers
21st-century Egyptian women writers
Year of birth missing (living people)